The 31st GLAAD Media Awards is the 2020 annual presentation of the GLAAD Media Awards, presented by GLAAD honoring the 2019 media season and held on July 30, 2020. The awards honor films, television shows, musicians and works of journalism that fairly, accurately and inclusively represent the LGBT community and issues relevant to the community. GLAAD announced the 176 nominees split across 30 categories on January 8, 2020, in New York City, New York. The award show was originally scheduled to be held in New York City, hosted by Lilly Singh, on March 19, 2020, with the remaining awards presented in Los Angeles on April 16, 2020. However, the award show was cancelled due to the COVID-19 pandemic. A virtual ceremony aired on GLAAD's Facebook and YouTube channels on July 30, 2020. The ceremony was hosted by Fortune Feimster and Gina Yashere, along with guest appearances from numerous celebrities.

Ceremony 
Guest appearances at the virtual ceremony include: Cara Delevingne, Sonya Deville, Kaitlyn Dever, Beanie Feldstein, Jonica T. Gibbs,  Dan Levy, Lil Nas X, Lilly Singh, Rachel Maddow, Ryan O’Connell, Dolly Parton,  Peppermint, Geena Rocero, Angelica Ross, Benito Skinner, Brian Michael Smith, Gabrielle Union, Dwyane Wade, Lena Waithe, Olivia Wilde, and Raquel Willis. Appearances were also scheduled by the cast and producers of Pose. Chloe x Halle performed. The ceremony was also broadcast on Logo TV on August 3, 2020.

Winners and nominees
Winners are presented in bold.

Film
{| class=wikitable
| style="vertical-align:top; width:50%;"|

 Booksmart (United Artists Releasing) Bombshell (Lionsgate)
 Downton Abbey (Focus Features)
 Judy (Roadside Attractions)
 Rocketman (Paramount Pictures)
| style="vertical-align:top; width:50%;"|

 Rafiki (Film Movement) Adam (Wolfe Releasing)
 Brittany Runs a Marathon (Amazon Studios)
 End of the Century (The Cinema Guild)
 The Heiresses (1844 Entertainment)
 Kanarie (Breaking Glass Pictures)
  Pain and Glory (Sony Pictures Classics)
 Portrait of a Lady on Fire (Neon)
 Socrates (Breaking Glass Pictures)
 This Is Not Berlin (Samuel Goldwyn Films)
|}

Television
{| class=wikitable
| style="vertical-align:top; width:50%;"|

 Schitt's Creek (Pop)
 Brooklyn Nine-Nine (NBC)
 Dear White People (Netflix)
 Dickinson (Apple TV+)
 One Day at a Time (Netflix)
 The Other Two (Comedy Central)
 Sex Education (Netflix)
 Superstore (NBC)
 Vida (Starz)
 Work in Progress (Showtime)
| style="vertical-align:top; width:50%;"|

 Pose (FX)
 Batwoman (The CW)
 Billions (Showtime)
 Euphoria (HBO)
 Killing Eve (BBC America)
 The L Word: Generation Q (Showtime)
 The Politician (Netflix)
 Shadowhunters (Freeform)
 Star Trek: Discovery (CBS All Access)
 Supergirl (The CW)
|-
| style="vertical-align:top; width:50%;"|

 "Two Doors Down" – Dolly Parton's Heartstrings (Netflix)
 "Love" –  Drunk History (Comedy Central)
 "Murdered at a Bad Address" – Law & Order: SVU (NBC)
 "Spontaneous Combustion" – Easy (Netflix)
 "This Extraordinary Being" – Watchmen (HBO)
| style="vertical-align:top; width:50%;"|

 Transparent: Musical Finale (Amazon Prime Video) Deadwood: The Movie (HBO)
 Let It Snow (Netflix)
 Rent: Live (Fox)
 Trapped: The Alex Cooper Story (Lifetime)
|-
| style="vertical-align:top; width:50%;"|

 Tales of the City (Netflix) Mrs. Fletcher (HBO)
 The Red Line (CBS)
 When They See Us (Netflix)
 Years and Years (HBO)
| style="vertical-align:top; width:50%;"|

 The Bravest Knight (Hulu) High School Musical: The Musical: The Series (Disney+) Andi Mack (Disney Channel)
 The Loud House (Nickelodeon)
 "Mr. Ratburn and the Special Someone" – Arthur (PBS)
 Rocko's Modern Life: Static Cling (Netflix)
 She-Ra and the Princesses of Power (Netflix)
 Steven Universe: The Movie (Cartoon Network)
 "A Tale of Two Nellas" – Nella the Princess Knight (Nick Jr.)
 Twelve Forever (Netflix)
|-
| style="vertical-align:top; width:50%;"|

 State of Pride (YouTube) 5B (RYOT)
 Gay Chorus Deep South (MTV)
 Leitis in Waiting (PBS)
 Wig (HBO)
| style="vertical-align:top; width:50%;"|

 Are You the One? (MTV) Bachelor in Paradise (ABC)
 I Am Jazz (TLC)
 Queer Eye (Netflix)
 RuPaul's Drag Race (VH1)
|-
| style="vertical-align:top; width:50%;"|

 "Jonathan Van Ness: Honey, She's An Onion With All Sorts of Layers" – The Late Show with Stephen Colbert (CBS) "Billy Porter Serves Cataract Realness, Fashion, and Tonys" – The View (ABC)
 "Ellen Meets Inspiring Mormon Valedictorian" – The Ellen DeGeneres Show (Syndicated/Telepictures)
 "Jacob Tobia – Promoting a ‘Gender-Chill’ Exploration of Identity with ‘Sissy’" - The Daily Show with Trevor Noah (Comedy Central)
 "Lilly Is Struggling to Date Women" – A Little Late with Lilly Singh (NBC)
| style="vertical-align:top; width:50%;"|

  (Univision)  (Univision)
  (Amazon Prime Video)
  (Netflix)
  (HBO)
|}

Journalism

Other
{| class="wikitable sortable"
|-
! Award
! Nominees
|-
! scope="row" |Outstanding Blog
|My Fabulous DiseaseGays With Kids
JoeMyGod
Pittsburgh Lesbian Correspondents
TransGriot
|-
! scope="row" |Outstanding Comic Book
|Star Wars: Doctor Aphra (Marvel Comics)The Avant-Guards (Boom! Studios)
Bloom (First Second)
Crowded (Image Comics)
Harley Quinn: Breaking Glass (DC Comics)
Laura Dean Keeps Breaking Up With Me (First Second)
Liebestrasse (ComiXology Originals)
Lumberjanes (Boom! Studios)
Runaways (Marvel Comics)
The Wicked + The Divine (Image Comics)
|-
! scope="row" |Outstanding Music Artist
|Lil Nas X – 7
Adam Lambert – Velvet: Side A
Brittany Howard – Jaime
Kevin Abstract – Arizona Baby
Kim Petras – Clarity
King Princess – Cheap Queen
Melissa Etheridge – The Medicine Show
Mika – My Name Is Michael Holbrook
Tegan and Sara – Hey, I'm Just Like You
Young M.A – Herstory in the Making
|-
! scope="row" |Outstanding Video Game
|
The Outer Worlds (Private Division)Apex Legends (Electronic Arts)
Borderlands 3 (2K Games)
Overwatch (Blizzard Entertainment)
The Walking Dead: The Final Season (Skybound Entertainment)
|-
! scope="row" |Outstanding Broadway Production
|The Inheritance by Matthew LopezChoir Boy by Tarell Alvin McCraney
Jagged Little Pill music by Alanis Morissette and Glen Ballard, lyrics by Alanis Morissette, book by Diablo Cody
Slave Play by Jeremy O. Harris
What the Constitution Means to Me by Heidi Schreck
|-
|}

Special RecognitionSpecial (Netflix)
Karen Ocamb, news editor, Los Angeles Blade
Mark Segal, founder and publisher, Philadelphia Gay News

References

GLAAD Media Awards ceremonies
GLAAD
2020 in New York City
2020 in Los Angeles